Phaedrias or Phaidrias was a town of ancient Arcadia. Phaedrias was on the road between Megalopolis and Carnasium.

Its site is unlocated.

References

Populated places in ancient Arcadia
Former populated places in Greece
Lost ancient cities and towns